Simon (also known as Lead Savior in his first appearance) is a fictional character from The Walking Dead television series. He was played by Canadian actor Steven Ogg.

Simon is the second-in-command of the Saviors and the personal right-hand man of the Saviors' leader, Negan. Simon is instrumental in capturing Rick Grimes and his group as they head in an RV to get Maggie Greene to the Hilltop Colony. Much like Daryl Dixon, Simon is an original character not included in the comic book series of the same name.

Appearances

Background
While little else is known about Simon before his introduction, in "Worth", he is revealed to have been responsible for the massacre of all the men of the Oceanside community. Negan recognized that Simon's cruelty could be put to productive means but needed to be watched closely, and thus Negan made him a high-ranking Savior.

Season 6
Simon is introduced in the Season 6 finale, "Last Day on Earth", where he is one of Negan's lieutenants working to route Rick Grimes and his group towards a designated meeting point by creating roadblocks. Once Rick and his allies arrive, Simon and other Saviors force the group to their knees as they are first introduced to Negan and "Lucille", his baseball bat wrapped with barbed wire. Seeking to force the group into submission for their transgressions against the Saviors, Negan prepares to kill one of them.

Season 7
In the Season 7 premiere, "The Day Will Come When You Won't Be", Negan first beats Abraham Ford's head to a pulp, and then kills Glenn Rhee as punishment when Daryl Dixon tries to stop Negan. Negan, Simon, and the other Saviors take Daryl as their captive as they depart back to their base, the Sanctuary.

Simon is assigned to be the Saviors' contact for the Hilltop community, assuring the cooperation of the cowardly Gregory to continue the Hilltop's offerings to the Saviors ("Go Getters"). When Daryl escapes the Sanctuary, Simon and the Saviors seek him out at the Alexandria Safe-Zone, ransacking the community, and warning Rick that retribution will come if they find him there ("Rock in the Road"). After Negan kills the Sanctuary's doctor, Simon recovers the doctor's brother who has been serving Hilltop. Simon becomes aware that Gregory is losing control of the community to Maggie Rhee, Glenn's wife, and Simon confides in Gregory to let him know if there is trouble. ("The Other Side") Eventually, Negan and the Saviors are forced to go to war with Rick and the Alexandria community, but Rick and his allies are able to repel the attack. Afterwards, Rick, Maggie, and King Ezekiel of the Kingdom community agree to launch an offensive against the Saviors, while Negan, Simon, and the other Saviors prepare for a new attack. ("The First Day of the Rest of Your Life")

Season 8
Gregory, now having lost all control of Hilltop to Maggie, comes to the Sanctuary to warn Simon, Negan, and the other lieutenants about this, but assures them that a bit of coercion can bring them back in line ("The Big Scary U", in flashback). Simon suggests they just wipe out the Hilltop community but Negan firmly dismisses that idea, as he sees the residents of these communities as resources. Just then, Rick's combined allies arrive at the Sanctuary, demanding they stop ("Mercy"). Negan refuses, and Simon tells Gregory to warn the Hilltop soldiers that they will be evicted from Hilltop if they ally with Rick; none of them defect and remain standing for Maggie, and Simon kicks Gregory off a set of stairs. Rick and his allies proceed to fire at the Sanctuary, forcing Negan to take cover within a box trailer, and the rest of the Saviors back inside as they purposely led a walker horde inside the Sanctuary fences as to contain the Saviors. As Rick and his allies leave, Gabriel Stokes sees Gregory struggling to protect himself, and helps rescue him, but Gregory panics and drives off alone, leaving Gabriel to end up taking shelter in the same box trailer as Negan.

Rick's attack leaves the Saviors unable to leave Sanctuary, allowing Rick and his group to seize control of other Savior outposts, including capturing several Saviors at an outpost normally overseen by Simon. At the Sanctuary, Simon, Dwight, and the other lieutenants, believing Negan to be dead, struggle in the power vacuum, and become concerned that one of them leaked information to Rick's group; Dwight, who has opted to help Rick, diverts their attention to other matters ("The Big Scary U"). Simon starts to take control, and his decisions lead to concern from the workers below. Just as the situation gets tense, Negan reveals himself to still be alive, having escaped the box trailer with Gabriel. Negan reasserts control. Circumstances lead the Saviors to wipe out the horde blocking them, and Negan quickly dispatches his lieutenants to face Rick's allies ("How It's Gotta Be"). Simon leads a group to Hilltop, capturing Jerry along the way, and stops Maggie and a convoy of vehicles as they head to another Savior outpost. Simon kills Neil, one of Maggie's soldiers, and turns Jerry back over to her in exchange for making her turn around and return to Hilltop. Meanwhile, Negan launches a major offensive at Alexandria, effectively destroying the community, through Carl Grimes is able to help protect the residents by having them hide in a sewer. Dwight, to protect his allies, is forced to turn on some Saviors during this, but one Savior, Laura, manages to escape before he can kill her.

As Negan organizes the Saviors to find the missing Alexanderians, he instructs Simon to go to the Scavengers, led by Jadis, and give them his "standard offer", to kill one of them to bring the others into line. ("The Lost and the Plunderers") Before he leaves, the Saviors receive a box from the Hilltop, containing the re-animated body of one of Simon's men that the Hilltop had captured, infuriating him. His anger is riled up when he faces Jadis, and orders his men to massacre the Scavengers. Jadis manages to survive by playing dead. Simon returns to the Sanctuary and reports that he had followed Negan's orders. Later, Negan devises a new plan to attack Hilltop with weapons covered in the viscera of walkers, so that those hit would turn and attack the community from inside ("The Key") As they drive there, Simon has Dwight ride with him, and confides that he believes Negan is not aggressive enough and thinks they should dispose him from power. Rick attacks Negan's car, knocking it out of the convoy. Simon and Dwight have the other Saviors hold guard as they search for Negan. They find his abandoned car, unaware that he is hiding from Rick in a nearby building. Simon asserts to Dwight this is their opportunity, and Dwight sets fire to the car. The two report back to the other Saviors that Negan is likely dead, and now instructs them that they will wipe out the Hilltop community. They are unaware that Negan survives Rick's attack, but is briefly captured by a vengeful Jadis, where he learns of Simon's disobedience. The Saviors' attack on Hilltop commences, but the Hilltop community is well-prepared, and able to fend off the attack ("Do Not Send Us Astray"). Simon and Dwight sneak into the Hilltop, and Simon is prepared to fire on Tara Chambler, who he knew led the earlier attack on his outpost. Dwight asks to take the shot, discretely but purposely only wounding her with a clean arrow. The Saviors are forced to flee back to the Sanctuary.

Simon prepares the Saviors for another large offensive when Negan reappears ("Worth"). Negan forces Simon to his knees, appearing ready to kill him for trying to seize control of the Saviors, but when Simon succumbs to his orders without question or resistance, Negan tells him all is forgiven. Simon meets with Dwight, urging him to gather any Savior that may be ready to overthrow Negan to a secret meeting. Dwight, trying to cover his own duplicity, agrees. At the meeting, Simon discovers Dwight told Negan about this, and Negan is furious at Simon for having gone against his orders in dealing with the Scavengers as he had with the Oceanside community. He tells Simon the only way to survive is to best him in a fist-fight. With all the Saviors gathered to watch, Simon attempts to kill Negan, but Negan readily overpowers him and chokes him to death. Negan then has Simon's re-animated body chained to the fence outside of Sanctuary. Following peace with the Saviors, the walkers are cleared from the fence and presumably killed, including Simon. ("Wrath")

Development and reception

In the season six finale, "Last Day on Earth", Steven Ogg made his debut as Simon, who is a member of the Saviors, the main antagonists in season seven, in which he became a recurring character.

Steven Ogg, who portrayed Simon, had been told by showrunner Scott M. Gimple that Simon was going to be killed off at the live season eight premiere event on October 22, 2017. Ogg asked Gimple to have Simon to go down in a "big cannonball". Both he and Jeffrey Dean Morgan, Negan's portrayer, acted out their roles in the final fight, despite neither having fight training.

Most critics commented positively on Ogg's performance in the season eight episode "Worth", with Joe Otterson of Variety saying “Once again, Steven Ogg proves himself to be one of the best villains in the game in this week's episode of “The Walking Dead”. Ogg's Simon makes his move to take over the Sanctuary, but his timing proves to be a little off.”

References

Fictional lieutenants
Fictional mass murderers
Fictional zombies and revenants
Television characters introduced in 2016
The Walking Dead (franchise) characters
The Walking Dead (TV series)